The SSM-N-6 Rigel was a proposed United States Navy submarine-launched, nuclear-capable ramjet-powered cruise missile.

Etymology
The Rigel missile was named after Rigel, the brightest star in the constellation Orion.

Development
In 1946 the US Navy sanctioned development of the Rigel missile as a sub-launched supersonic weapon to attack enemy shores, in parallel with development of the subsonic SSM-N-8 Regulus. The SSM-N-6 was to be launched by means of 4 rocket boosters and a catapult, with two ramjets for the cruise mode of the flight.

Several Rigel test articles were built to test the planned ramjet system for the Rigel missile. They had a single ramjet and a single rocket booster. Subsequently, scaled-down Flight Test Vehicles (FTVs) were built with a configuration similar to the full-scale missile, and the first FTV launch occurred in May 1950. Unfortunately, plans to build the SSM-N-6 missiles were cancelled because the failure of FTV flight tests, but also due to the fact that Rigel posed a problem for submariners by requiring a longer launch rail on submarines than the SSM-N-8 Regulus.

Operators

United States Navy (planned)

See also
List of missiles

References

Nuclear cruise missiles of the United States
Nuclear cruise missiles of the United States Navy
Cruise missiles of the Cold War
Cold War nuclear missiles of the United States